XHTEY-FM 93.7/XETEY-AM 840 is a combo radio station in Tepic, Nayarit, Mexico. It is owned by Radiorama and carries a grupera format known as Fiesta La Más Picuda.

History

XETEY received its first concession on July 18, 1990. It added its FM station in 1994.

It originally known as Sensación before Fiesta Mexicana and renamed Fiesta La Más Picuda.

References

External links
 Radio Sensación Website

Grupo Radiorama
1990 establishments in Mexico
Radio stations established in 1990
Radio stations in Nayarit
Regional Mexican radio stations
Spanish-language radio stations